This is a list of notable people associated with Yeshiva University, a private university in New York City. The list includes alumni, attendees, and faculty members past and present of the university.

Notable alumni

Academia
 David Berger (born 1943), Dean Emeritus at Bernard Revel Graduate School of Judaic Studies
 Michael Broyde (born 1964), law professor
 Shaye J. D. Cohen (B.A. 1970), Professor of Hebrew Literature & Philosophy at Harvard 
 Samuel J. Danishefsky, Professor of Chemistry at Columbia University and the Sloan-Kettering Cancer Center in New York
 Professor Laurence Dreyfus, Bach Scholar and Fellow of Magdalen College, Oxford
 Ari L. Goldman, Columbia University professor and journalist
 Paul Gottfried, former professor at Elizabethtown College
 Gary Gruber, author, physicist, testing expert, educator
 A. Leo Levin (1919–2015), University of Pennsylvania Law School law professor 
 Matthew Levitt, counterterrorism expert
 Emanuel Rackman (1910–2008), Modern Orthodox rabbi; President of Bar-Ilan University
 Michael Rosenak, Israeli philosopher of Jewish education
 Leonard Susskind, Felix Bloch professor of physics at Stanford University
 Steven Winter, Walter S. Gibbs Professor of Constitutional Law at Wayne State University Law School

Law

 Jeff Ballabon, lawyer
 Noach Dear (1953–2020), New York Supreme Court judge
 Alan Dershowitz, attorney, attended BTA
 Sandra J. Feuerstein, Judge of the United States District Court for the Eastern District of New York
 Jason Greenblatt, U.S. Special Representative for International Negotiations, executive vice president and chief legal officer to Donald Trump and The Trump Organization
 Nat Lewin, attorney
 Abraham David Sofaer, Judge of the United States District Court for the Southern District of New York
 Shalom David Stone, attorney; nominee for the Third US Circuit Court of Appeals

Government and politics
 Howard Dean, Governor of Vermont, physician (medical degree)
 Louis Henkin, jurist
 Daniel Kurtzer, former Ambassador to Egypt and Israel
 Olga A. Mendez, Chairwoman of the New York State Senate Labor Committee
 Grace Meng, Congresswoman from New York (J.D.)
 Sheldon Silver, Speaker of New York State Assembly 1994

Arts and media
 Elon Gold, actor and comedian of Stacked fame, attended MTA
 Eddie Huang, chef, writer, and television personality (J.D. 2008)
 Lucy Kaplansky, singer-songwriter
 Aaron Klein, reporter, radio personality, author
 Yaakov Lemmer, chazzan
 Barbara Olson, television commentator
 Chaim Potok, author, most notably of The Chosen
 Josh Saviano, actor (law degree)
 Nachum Segal, radio host
 Ari Shaffir, comedian, actor, podcaster, writer, and producer
 Laura Sydell, National Public Radio

Religion
 Nachman Bulman, rabbi
 Shlomo Einhorn, dean of Yavneh Hebrew Academy
 Chaim (Howard) Jachter, rabbi
 Meir Kahane, Orthodox rabbi and Knesset member, attended BTA
 Ezra Labaton, rabbi
 Aharon Lichtenstein, rabbi
 Haskel Lookstein, rabbi
 Dr. Moses Mescheloff, rabbi
 Avigdor Miller, Haredi rabbi
 Shlomo Riskin, rabbi
 Joseph Telushkin, rabbi, lecturer, and author
 Moshe David Tendler, rabbi
 Moshe Weinberger, Haredi rabbi
 Mordechai Willig, rabbi
 Chaim Zimmerman, rabbi
 Meir Soloveichik, rabbi and public thinker
 Hershel Schachter, rabbi
 Harold M. Schulweis, rabbi

Medicine and sciences
 Raymond Damadian, pioneer of MRI technology
 Samuel J. Danishefsky, chemist, winner of the Wolf Prize in Chemistry in 1995/96
 Hillel Furstenberg, mathematician
 Rudolph Leibel, medical researcher
 David Macht, pharmacologist
 Daniel Wise, mathematician
 Martin L. Yarmush, biomedical engineer and physician

Business
 Stan Kasten, President of the Los Angeles Dodgers, attended MTA
 Ralph Lauren, designer, attended MTA
 Mark Nordlicht, hedge fund manager
 David Samson, Miami Marlins executive (J.D. 1992)
 Ahmed Zayat, owner of American Pharoah, winner of the Kentucky Derby and Preakness Stakes

Other

 Ryan Turell, professional basketball player
 Randi Weingarten, President of the United Federation of Teachers (law degree)
 Baruch Goldstein, Perpetrator of the Cave of the Patriarchs massacre.

Notable faculty and staff
 Danny Ayalon
 Samuel Belkin
 David Berger
Saul J. Berman, author 
 Benjamin Blech, author (also alumnus)
 J. David Bleich
 Elisheva Carlebach
 Shalom Carmy, theologian and Jewish historian (also alumnus)
 Pinkhos Churgin (1894-1957), first President of Bar-Ilan University
 Bernard Epstein
 Louis Feldman
 Steven Fine
 Joshua Fishman, linguist
 Jekuthiel Ginsburg
 Jason Greenblatt
 Paul Greengard, Nobel Prize winner
 Lawrence Hajioff, Judaic studies faculty
 Elazar Hurvitz, historian
 Richard Joel, president
 David Alan Johnson
 Ephraim Kanarfogel, dean and historian (also alumnus)
 Arthur Komar
 Joy Ladin, Gottesman Chair in English at Stern College for Women (2003-2021)
 Norman Lamm, chancellor (also alumnus)
 Joe Lieberman, US Senator
 Bernard Madoff, former Chairman & Treasurer of the Board of Directors of the Sy Syms School of Business
 Marysa Navarro, historian 
 Adam Zachary Newton
 Michael Rosensweig
 Oliver Sacks, neurologist
 Hershel Schachter, rabbi (also alumnus)
 Jacob J. Schachter
 Barry Scheck, lawyer
 Lawrence Schiffman
 Shimon Shkop
 Eli Baruch Shulman
 Nahum Slouschz
 Joseph B. Soloveitchik, The Rav, (deceased), rabbi and talmudist
 Telford Taylor (deceased), lawyer
 Moshe Tendler, rabbi and medical ethics authority (also alumnus)
 Mayer Twersky, rabbi
 Abraham Weiss (1895–1970), professor of Talmud 
 Mordechai Willig, Rosh Kollel (also alumnus)
 Rachel Wischnitzer
 Herman Wouk, author
 Benjamin Yudin, rabbi
 Dov Zakheim, political adviser
 Solomon Zeitlin
 Bob Tufts, former MLB pitcher

References

Yeshiva University
 
 
Yeshiva